Agassiz Glacier  may refer to:  
Agassiz Glacier (Alaska)
Agassiz Glacier (Montana)
Agassiz Glacier (New Zealand)

See also 
Agassiz Ice Cap